Stuart Webster (born 11 June 1946) is an Australian former cricketer. He played twenty-three first-class and two List A matches for New South Wales between 1972/73 and 1977/78.

See also
 List of New South Wales representative cricketers

References

External links
 

1946 births
Living people
Australian cricketers
New South Wales cricketers
People from Orange, New South Wales
Cricketers from New South Wales